Mncedisi Malika (born 12 June 1997) is a South African first-class cricketer. He was included in the Border squad for the 2016 Africa T20 Cup. He made his List A debut for Border in the 2016–17 CSA Provincial One-Day Challenge on 23 October 2016. In August 2018, he was named in Border's squad for the 2018 Africa T20 Cup. He was the leading run-scorer for Border in the 2018–19 CSA 3-Day Provincial Cup, with 496 runs in ten matches. In April 2021, he was named in Border's squad, ahead of the 2021–22 cricket season in South Africa.

References

External links
 

1997 births
Living people
South African cricketers
Border cricketers
Place of birth missing (living people)